Ripples is a community in the Canadian province of New Brunswick near the village of Minto and Route 10 on the Little River.

History

Ripples housed a World War Two internment camp, from 1940 to 1945. This camp held internees of many different nationalities. The most famous prisoner was Camillien Houde, mayor of Montreal at the time, who was interned for encouraging resistance to military conscription.

Notable people

See also
List of communities in New Brunswick

References

Communities in Sunbury County, New Brunswick
World War II internment camps in Canada